Witley Park, formerly known as Lea Park, is an estate dating from the 19th-century between Godalming and Haslemere, Surrey, England. Its landscaped grounds include three artificial lakes, one of which conceals an underwater conservatory and smoking room.

In 1890, the swindler Whitaker Wright purchased Lea Park, and the adjacent South Park Farm, from the Earl of Derby. The title to the estate included the titular Lordship of the Manor and control of Hindhead Common and the Devil's Punch Bowl. Wright developed the pre-existing house into a 32-bedroom mansion adjacent to one of three artificial lakes, and within the landscaped grounds. Underneath an adjacent lake Wright built an underwater conservatory and smoking room, with aquarium windows, upon which a statue of Neptune stands, giving the appearance it is floating on the water. After Wright committed suicide upon conviction for fraud, his properties were auctioned off. Much of Hindhead Common, Witley Common and Thursley Common was passed on to the National Trust.

The remnants of Lea Park were sold to William Pirrie, 1st Viscount Pirrie, who was involved in the building of RMS Titanic. The letter P with a crown above can be seen on metal gates in the estate and previously-owned lands. The 32-bedroom mansion burned down in 1952. The estate was renamed Witley Park by the Leigh family. Witley Park House, a Modern movement home designed by Patrick Gwynne, was built elsewhere on the estate in 1961.  The landscaped park remained. In 1982 the estate, now comprising some 1,300 acres, was purchased by Sir Raymond and Lady Brown. In 2002 the Brown family sold the 450 acres of walled-off Parkland, Gate Lodges and Cottages, retaining Witley Park Farm to the south. Permission for a new house on the site of the old mansion was granted around 2004 and the house is now completed.

References

External links

 Article on Witley Park on bbc.co.uk
 Atlas Obscura entry
 LOST HERITAGE / England's lost country houses
 Godalming Museum entry

Country houses in Surrey
Gardens in Surrey
English gardens in English Landscape Garden style